Hira Nagar railway station is a small railway station in Kathua district, Jammu and Kashmir, India. Its code is HRNR. It serves Hiranagar town. The station consists of 2 platforms. The platform is not well sheltered. It lacks many facilities including water and sanitation.

References

Firozpur railway division
Railway stations in Kathua district